In the Socialist Autonomous Province of Kosovo, which was at the time one of the two socialist autonomous provinces of the Socialist Republic of Serbia and one of the federal units of the Socialist Federal Republic of Yugoslavia, a single-party system was in place. During this time there were eight heads of state, all from the ranks of the League of Communists of Yugoslavia (SKJ). The federal party was organized into six sub-organizations - the republic parties, one for each of the six federal republics. Kosovan politicians and presidents of the presidency of the period were members of the League of Communists of Yugoslavia through their membership in the League of Communists of Kosovo (SKK), the Kosovan part of the federal party (as was respectively the case with all Yugoslav politicians).

See also
 List of rulers of Kosovo
 President of Kosovo
 Prime Minister of Kosovo

References

Government of Yugoslavia
Kosovo
Politics of Yugoslavia
Socialist Republic of Serbia
Politics of Kosovo